Joe Matera is an Australian guitarist, rock journalist and author. In addition to a solo career, Matera is the guitarist in the Sweden-based rock band Rough Rockers, and was formerly the lead guitarist of Australian famous pop rock band Geisha between 2007 and 2010. Before joining Geisha, Matera was the lead guitarist of classic rock band Double Vision, from 2003 to 2008. He's currently working as a solo artist, releasing solo instrumental albums and contributing guitar on various recordings around the world. In 2022, he collaborated with the British band, The Korgis, on an album for the Japanese market.

Matera is also well known as a rock journalist, having published over 600 articles since 1999. As of 2022, he  writes for magazines such as Guitar Player, Guitar World, Goldmine, Record Collector and others. Since July 2022, he has written a music column called, 'Musical Musings' for the Shepparton News.

He has interviewed bands and celebrities including Aerosmith, Metallica, Foo Fighters, Kiss, Queen, Iron Maiden, Bon Jovi and Black Sabbath. Matera's work has appeared in many magazines such as Classic Rock, Guitar & Bass, Metal Hammer and Total Guitar.

Biography
Matera was born in Kyabram and took up the guitar at age 15, teaching himself how to play along the records of his parents collection and the sounds of the bands of his day. He joined his first band in the late 1980s, moving through a succession of bands in his local area. In 1994 he was asked to join the Shepparton Theatre Arts group production of Les Misérables. The success of the production saw Matera returning for the 1995 stage production of Chess.

In late 2000, he moved to Melbourne to further his music career, joining a number of original band as well as branching out in music journalism with his work appearing in magazines around the world ranging from Guitar World to Classic Rock. He formed and led his own band Double Vision between 2003 and 2008, and in 2007 joined a new line-up of Australian rock band Geisha, making his recording debut with the band on the single "Birthday" which was produced by the US producer Tom Werman. Matera also shared the live stages with the Australian acts as Taxiride and Dragon.

After releasing three further singles and an album with Geisha, Matera decided to quit the band to pursue a solo career in late 2010. His debut solo single, the instrumental "Travellin' West" appeared later that year. In 2011 he signed to European-based label W.A.R Productions, where he released the EP "Slave to the Fingers" which featured guest performances by Rick Brewster (The Angels), Mick McConnell (Smokie) and Tony Dolan (VENOM). In 2012 he released his debut album Creature of Habit, which received critical acclaim. The album was accompanied by Matera's first tour of Europe. The single "Fallen Angel" featured Matera's first lead vocal outing, with the single gaining airplay on European radio including BBC Radio. In 2013, the song was voted No. 154 (of 1000) on the Austrian station Life Radio's Hit Countdown for that year.

Aside from his solo career, Matera has contributed guitar to a number of international recordings such as Atomkraft, and their cover of Thin Lizzy's "Cold Sweat". Matera's original instrumental "Starry Night" was featured on the soundtrack of the Australian movie Ricky! The Movie.

In April 2012 Matera accompanied English singer-songwriter Steve Harley on his first promotional tour of Australia. The tour included various appearances on radio and TV, performing live acoustic sessions. This included the Melbourne radio station Gold FM 104.3, and Noise 11 TV. In 2013 he made an appearance playing on four tracks of the Austrian ambient metal band Uruk-Hai's album ...And All The Magic & Might He Brought.... In 2014 Matera released his second album Terra Firma and in May 2014 commenced on his second European tour.

Matera's third solo album, titled Louder Than Words, was released in July 2015. It was described by the German Gitarre & Bass magazine, as "Mainstream Rock with real old school grooves". The song "Feel Your Love" reached #15 on Radio Berlin's Hey Music Chart. To promote the album, Matera embarked on his third European tour during June–July 2015. In October 2015 Matera became the Dutch record label RVPrecords' first international signing. In December 2015, Matera received a Commended Entry Award in the 'Rock' category of the 2015 UK Songwriting Contest with "Feel Your Love". A new compilation Now and Then was released through the RVPrecords label in February 2016. In July–August, Matera embarked on his 4th European tour to support the new compilation album.

In June–July 2017, Matera was the support act for the Bay City Rollers at their two Melbourne shows. The EP, Heart of Stone, was released in September by RVPrecords, along with the title track as a single. Matera undertook his fifth European tour in October to promote the release. In 2018, Matera joined the Sweden-based rock band Rough Rockers, while also releasing the EP Waiting for the Sun later in the year. In April 2019, the Rough Rockers released the EP Smoke and Mirrors. Matera embarked on his sixth European tour in April–May 2019, While in Stockholm, he became the first Australian musician to record music at Sunlight Studio, where he worked with producer Tomas Skogsberg. Matera is also a regular guest on Nicole Chvastek's Statewide Drive show on 107.9 ABC Ballarat.

Matera released the single "Inside Looking Out" in October 2021, which features Don Powell of Slade fame on drums and Janne Borgh on bass. Matera's autobiography, Backstage Pass: The Grit and the Glamour, was released in October 2021 by the UK publisher Empire Publications.

Discography

Solo works

Albums
 Creature of Habit (2012)
 Terra Firma (2014)
 Louder Than Words (2015)

Compilations
 Now and Then (2016)
 Electric Wire (2020)

Extended plays
 Slave to the Fingers (2011)
 Heart of Stone (2017)
 Waiting for the Sun(2018)
 eclectica (2021)

Singles
 "Starry Night" (2009)
 "Travellin' West" (2010)
 "Almost With You" (2011)
 "Face Off" (2011)
 "Fallen Angel/Slide" (2012)
 "Shining Star" (2013)
 "Tell Me Why" (2014)
 "Louder Than Words" (2015)
 "Heart of Stone" (2017)
 "Waiting for the Sun" (2018)
 "Semantics" (Sam Inglis Remix) (2019)
 "Overload" (2019)
 "Only One" (2020)
 "Take a Look" (feat. Janne Schaffer) (2021)
 "Inside Looking Out" (2021)

Other
 "Live in London" (2017, limited edition cassette)

Double Vision
 "Double Vision" (demo, 2004)
 "Triple Shot" (demo, 2007)

Geisha
 "Birthday" (single, 2009)
 "Mystery Writer" (single, 2010)
 "Tin Soldier / Kabuki 2010" (single, 2010)
 Yesterday, Today And Tomorrow (LP, 2010)

Rough Rockers
 "The Rough Rocker" (single, 2018)
 "Smoke & Mirrors" (EP, 2019)

Other contributions
 Atomkraft – "Cold Sweat" (EP, 2011)
 Cassie Patterson – Swift Recovery (2011)
  Uruk-Hai – ...And All the Magic & Might He Brought... (2013)

Bibliography
Backstage Pass: The Grit and the Glamour, 2021, Empire Publications, autobiography

References

External links
Official website
Discogs entry

Living people
Australian rock guitarists
Year of birth missing (living people)